The bril is an old, non-SI, unit of luminance. The SI unit of luminance is the candela per square metre.

Unit conversions

See also
 Photometry (optics)

Units of luminance
Centimetre–gram–second system of units